Michael Samuels may refer to:

Michael Samuels (linguist) (1920–2010), British historical linguist
Michael Samuels (director), British TV director and producer
Michael Anthony Samuels (born 1939), American ambassador
Michael Samuels, singer on Riverdance: Music from the Show
Michael Samuels, a (fictional) character in the TV series House of Cards